The 1975 Football Championship of Ukrainian SSR was the 45th season of association football competition of the Ukrainian SSR, which was part of the Soviet Second League in Zone 6. The season started on 13 April 1975.

The 1975 Football Championship of Ukrainian SSR was won by FC Kryvbas Kryvyi Rih.

The "Ruby Cup" of Molod Ukrayiny newspaper (for the most scored goals) was received by SC Lutsk.

Teams

Location map

Relegated teams 
 none

Promoted teams 
 FC Lokomotyv Zhdanov – (returning after two seasons)

Relocated and renamed teams 
 FC Avanhard Sevastopol changed its name to FC Khvylya Sevastopol.

Final standings

Top goalscorers 
The following were the top goalscorers.

See also 
 Soviet Second League

Notes

References

External links 
 1975 Soviet Second League, Zone 2 (Ukrainian SSR football championship). Luhansk football portal
 1975 Soviet championships (all leagues) at helmsoccer.narod.ru

1975
3
Soviet
Soviet
football
Football Championship of the Ukrainian SSR